Mohammad Ghodsi (Persian: محمد قدسی) is an Iranian computer scientist, electrical engineer, and professor. Ghodsi is also the project director of FarsiTeX, a Persian typesetting language derived from TeX. He was the team leader for the Iranian national team participating in the International Olympiad in Informatics for several years. He was also chosen as the top professor in Iran and has received his prize from ex-president Mohammad Khatami .

References 

Academic staff of Sharif University of Technology
Living people
Year of birth missing (living people)